Lucknow NR railway division is one of the five railway divisions under Northern Railway zone (NR) of Indian Railways. This railway division was formed on 23 April 1867 and its headquarters are located at Lucknow in the state of Uttar Pradesh.

Delhi railway division, Firozpur railway division, Ambala railway division and Moradabad railway division are the other railway divisions under NR Zone headquartered at New Delhi.

List of railway stations and towns 
The list includes the stations  under the Lucknow railway division and their station category. 

Stations closed for Passengers -

References

 
Divisions of Indian Railways
1867 establishments in India